rRNA 2'-O-methyltransferase fibrillarin is an enzyme that in humans is encoded by the FBL gene.

Function 

This gene product is a component of a nucleolar small nuclear ribonucleoprotein (snRNP) particle thought to participate in the first step in processing pre-ribosomal (r)RNA. It is associated with the U3, U8, and U13 small nucleolar RNAs and is located in the dense fibrillar component (DFC) of the nucleolus. The encoded protein contains an N-terminal repetitive domain that is rich in glycine and arginine residues, like fibrillarins in other species. Its central region resembles an RNA-binding domain and contains an RNP consensus sequence. Antisera from approximately 8% of humans with the autoimmune disease scleroderma recognize fibrillarin.

Fibrillarin is a component of several ribonucleoproteins including a nucleolar small nuclear ribonucleoprotein (SnRNP) and one of the two classes of small nucleolar ribonucleoproteins (snoRNPs). SnRNAs function in RNA splicing while snoRNPs function in ribosomal RNA processing. 

Fibrillarin is associated with U3, U8 and U13 small nuclear RNAs in mammals and is similar to the yeast NOP1 protein. Fibrillarin has a well conserved sequence of around 320 amino acids, and contains 3 domains, an N-terminal Gly/Arg-rich region; a central domain resembling other RNA-binding proteins and containing an RNP-2-like consensus sequence; and a C-terminal alpha-helical domain. An evolutionarily related pre-rRNA processing protein, which lacks the Gly/Arg-rich domain, has been found in various archaea.

A study by Schultz et al. indicated that the K-turn binding 15.5-kDa protein (called Snu13 in yeast) interacts with spliceosome proteins hPRP31, hPRP3, hPRP4, CYPH and the small nucleolar ribonucleoproteins NOP56, NOP58, and fibrillarin. The 15.5-kDa protein has sequence similarity to other RNA-binding proteins such as ribosomal proteins S12, L7a, and L30 and the snoRNP protein NHP2. The U4/U6 snRNP contains 15.5-kDa protein. The 15.5-kDa protein also exists in a ribonucleoprotein complex that binds the U3 box B/C motif. The 15.5-kDa protein also exists as one of the four core proteins of the C/D small nucleolar ribonucleoprotein that mediates methylation of pre-ribosomal RNAs.

Structural evidence supporting the idea that fibrillarin is the snoRNA methyltransferase has been reviewed.

Interactions 

Fibrillarin has been shown to interact with DDX5 and SMN1.

References

Further reading 

 
 
 
 
 
 
 
 
 
 
 
 
 
 
 
 
 
 

Molecular biology